The NER Class P (LNER Class J24) was a class of 0-6-0 steam locomotives of the North Eastern Railway. They were designed by Wilson Worsdell for mineral traffic.

Modifications
As built, the locomotives had slide valves but 20 were fitted with piston valves and superheaters between 1914 and 1920.  The cylinder bore was increased by half an inch at the same time.

In the infobox (right) 'ns' denotes non-superheated and 'su' denotes superheated. Some locomotives later had their superheaters removed but the piston valves were retained.

British Railways
Thirty-four locomotives survived into British Railways ownership in 1948 and their BR numbers were 65600-65644 (with gaps).

Withdrawal
Withdrawals started under LNER ownership in 1933. British Railways quickly withdrew the remaining locomotives and all had gone by the end of 1951. None were preserved.

References

0-6-0 locomotives
P
Railway locomotives introduced in 1894
Scrapped locomotives
Standard gauge steam locomotives of Great Britain
Freight locomotives